Due date may refer to

 Due date (payment), the last valid day of payment for an invoice
 Due date (pregnancy), the estimated delivery date for a pregnant woman
 Due Date, a 2010 American movie
 Due Date, a 2011 solo exhibition by American artist Brian Adam Douglas
 “Due Date”, an episode in season 6 of the Canadian TV series Holmes on Homes

See also 
 Due (disambiguation)
 Date due slip